The 1976–77 Athenian League season was the 54th in the history of Athenian League. The league consisted of 33 teams.

Division One

The division featured two new teams, promoted from last season's Division Two: 
 Epping Town  (1st)
 Epsom & Ewell  (2nd)

League table

Division Two

The division joined four new teams:
 Farnborough Town, from London Spartan League Division One
 Chalfont St.Peter, from London Spartan League Division Two
 Kingsbury Town, from London Spartan League Division One
 Chertsey Town, from London Spartan League Division One

League table

References

1976–77 in English football leagues
Athenian League